Argyrotaenia cupressae is a species of moth of the family Tortricidae. It is found in the United States, where it has been recorded from California.

The wingspan is about 18–19 mm. Adults have been recorded on wing from May to September.

The larvae feed on Cupressus goveniana, Cupressus forbesii, Cupressus guadalupensis, Cupressus macrocarpa, Cupressus sargentii, Cupressus sempervirens, Juniperus californica and Sequoia sempervirens.

Subspecies
Argyrotaenia cupressae cupressae
Argyrotaenia cupressae beyeria Powell, 1960 (California)

References

C
Endemic fauna of California
Fauna of the California chaparral and woodlands
Moths of North America
Moths described in 1960